BCOR may stand for:

 Back central optic radius, an alternative term for the base curve radius of a contact lens
 The human gene BCOR that encodes the BCL-6 corepressor protein